The 1930 St. Xavier Musketeers football team was an American football team that represented Xavier University as a member of the Ohio Athletic Conference (OAC) during the 1930 college football season. In its eleventh season under head coach Joseph A. Meyer, the team compiled a 6–4 record (2–1 against OAC opponents) and outscored all opponents by a total of 170 to 86.

Schedule

References

St. Xavier
Xavier Musketeers football seasons
St. Xavier Musketeers football